James Lockwood  (April 21, 1683 – May 5, 1769) was a member of the Connecticut House of Representatives from Norwalk, Connecticut Colony. He was the youngest son of Ephraim Lockwood and Mercy St. John and the brother of Eliphalet Lockwood.

Lockwood served in the following sessions of the House:

 May 1721
 May 1722
 October 1723
 October 1724
 May 1726
 May 1727
 May 1729
 May and October 1732
 May 1733
 May and October 1735
 May 1738
 October 1739
 May and October 1740
 October 1742
 May 1746
 October 1748
 October 1749
 October 1751

He was appointed a justice of the peace by the General Assembly from 1744 to 1756.

References 

1683 births
1769 deaths
Burials in Pine Island Cemetery
Members of the Connecticut House of Representatives
Politicians from Norwalk, Connecticut
American justices of the peace
People of colonial Connecticut
Burials in Connecticut